"Arcadia" is a song by Dutch DJs Hardwell and Joey Dale. It features singer Luciana. It is the first single from Hardwell's 2015 debut studio album United We Are.

Track listing

Charts

References 

2015 songs
2015 singles
Hardwell songs
Songs written by Nick Clow
Songs written by Luciana Caporaso
Songs written by Hardwell